The New Thessaloniki railway station (Neos Sidirodromikos Stathmos Thessalonikis) is the main central passenger railway station and terminal of Thessaloniki, Greece’s second-largest city. It is located in the central quarter of Xirokrini on Monastiriou Street and was inaugurated on 12 June 1961, the passenger station replaced the older and much smaller passenger station which now handles the city's cargo rail, hence the name "new railway station" which has been retained.

As of 2020, long-distance trains from New Thessaloniki railway station are run by TrainOSE to Athens, Alexandroupoli, Larissa, and Florina; other long-distance operators include. Bulgarian Railways, Serbian Railways and Makedonski Železnici, to Sofia, Belgrade and Skopje railway station respectively. In addition, Proastiakos Thessaloniki runs suburban commuter trains in and around Thessaly and Western Macedonia. Although largely unchanged since the 1960s, it remains the largest and busiest railway station built in Greece and one of the country's most important works of modern architecture. A metro station is currently also under construction at the station, to connect the New Thessaloniki railway station with the city’s new Metro system.

History  

The architectural tender for the new railway station, to replace the now outdated Old Thessaloniki railway station was announced in 1935 construction began 26 October 1937 following an international architectural design competition that was carried out at the time and won by German architect Hans Kleinschmidt, a notable runner-up was Nikolaos Mitsakis. Kleinschmidt‘s complete designs were never realised as they were later changed by other architects, but formed the base for what the station would later become. The main concrete shell of the building was completed before the Second World War, but construction was halted when Greece entered the war. Although the building was bombed throughout the early 1940s, it did not sustain heavy damage.

Following the war, the station saw no development for over 20 years; however, the station began to operate in a substandard manner, while the old station continued to function as the city’s railway terminus. In 1958, the project was restarted, headed by Greek architects Molfesi and Papagianni, who made changes to the original design by Kleinschmidt, with a more modernist style. The project was finally completed in New Objectivity style, handed over to the Ministry of Public Works three years later, and Inaugurated on 12 June 1961, On its completion the station, occupied an area of 90 acres, making it one of the largest railway stations in the Balkans.

Electrification was installed in the 1990s with the assistance of the Romanian Railways, and in 1998 the first electric services started to Gevgelija using a leased CFR Class 41 locomotive of the Brașov depot.

In 2001 the infrastructure element of OSE was created, known as GAIAOSE; it would henceforth be responsible for the maintenance of stations, bridges and other elements of the network, as well as the leasing and the sale of railway assists. In 2003, OSE launched "Proastiakos SA", as a subsidiary to serve the operation of the suburban network in the urban complex of Athens during the 2004 Olympic Games. In 2005, TrainOSE was created as a brand within OSE to concentrate on rail services and passenger interface.

The station has remained largely unchanged since that time, although minor additions have occurred, such as the construction of a shopping centre adjacent to the waiting hall and the installation of escalators for access to the platforms. In April 2006, the construction works of the Thessaloniki Metro began, with the most recent addition to the station, the construction of a metro station that is to form part of the new railway station complex. In 2008, all Proastiakos were transferred from OSE to TrainOSE.

In late 2019 the Metro station was open to the public for guided tours as part of Open House Thessaloniki. In February 2011, the station suffered a loss of importance given the suspension of all rail links to international destinations. In 2014, however, international connections were partially restored with twice-daily trains to Sofia and the reinstatement of the over-night train to Skopje and Belgrade. As of November 2021 the Friendship Express to Istanbul remains suspended.

On 16 January 2021, The first of five White Arrow high-speed trains (ordered by Trainose arrived in Thessaloniki from Italy). After crew training rollingstock tests, the train's first trip with passengers on board will be on the Athens-Thessaloniki line on 25 March, a date chosen to coincide with the 200th anniversary of the 1821 Greek Revolution against Ottoman rule. In October 2021 a Suburban service (train 3590), from Larissa derailed just outside the Thessaloniki station The derailment is being blamed on poor and delayed maintenance on the existing rail infrastructure. No reports of injuries to passengers or staff were reported. In July 2022, the station began being served by Hellenic Train, the rebranded TrainOSE.

Facilities

The Station currently features large waiting areas, a central hall with cafes, restaurants, a small chapel and a shopping centre within a 1960s era building. The staffed station has staffed ticket offices and luggage lockers. There is a taxi rank and Parking in the forecourt. On the platforms, seating is available under the original 1960s modernist canopies.

Discussions are underway for the expansion of the station and a general overhaul, which will also include a hotel and a revamp of the central offices of the OSE for northern Greece.

In June 2020, during the COVID-19 pandemic, the station was one of the first in Greece to Utilise thermal cameras in order to measure the temperature of staff and passengers, as an additional precautionary measure against the coronavirus.

Future
Apart from creating a subway station, the Hellenic Railways Organization (which owns the New railway station) has announced its intentions to overhaul the station. The plans will include the creation of a 150-bed hotel and regional offices of the OSE. Until now, no official statement has been given on the matter.

Services

Proastiakos

The station is served the following lines of the Thessaloniki Proastiakos or suburban railway:

 Thessaloniki - Larissa with 1 tph. (transfer to Regional, Express & InterCity services at Sindos).

 Thessaloniki - Florina with 1 tph. (transfer to Regional, Express & InterCity services at Sindos).

 Thessaloniki - Serres with 1 tpd (2021). (transfer to Regional, Express & InterCity services at Gallikos).

National and international train services 

The station is served the following Hellenic Train services:
 Regional services to Palaiofarsalos.
 Express services to Kalambaka.
 Intercity routes to Alexandroupoli.
 Intercity routes to Athens.
 InterCity Express routes to Athens.
 International routes to Belgrade via Skopje.
 International routes to Sofia (rail replacement bus part of the journey)

Between July 2005 and February 2011, the Friendship Express, (an international InterCity train jointly operated by the Turkish State Railways (TCDD) and TrainOSE linking Istanbul's Sirkeci Terminal, Turkey and Greece terminated at New Thessaloniki railway station.

Local public transport

The station is also served by local and regional buses:

ΟΑΣΘ operates Lines Χ1, Ν1 (νυκτερινό), 2Κ, 3Κ, 09, 10, 11, 14, 14Α, 17, 19, 23, 37, 38, 40, 45, 51, 52, 54, 55Χ, 56, 64, ( 70, 71 summer itineraries), 84 while OSE operates some services.
(All services are accessible from the forecourt).

Line layout

Transportation

Currently, the only means of transportation to and from the New railway station are the public bus services of the Thessaloniki Urban Transport Organization (OASTH) and by hiring a private taxi. Line 78 of OASTH connects the railway station with Macedonia InterCity Bus Terminal (KTEL) and Macedonia International Airport. A Thessaloniki Metro station is currently under construction at the New railway station, which upon completion, will connect the train station with the city's metro network. The subway station is set to open in 2014.

The station provides minimal parking space, although two new underground parking facilities, with four floors each, are currently under construction as part of the Thessaloniki Metro project. When completed, they will provide parking space for 450 and 600 cars, respectively, with a total capacity of 1050 cars.

Gallery

See also
 Athens railway station
 Thessaloniki Urban Transport Organization
 Railways of Greece
 Greek railway stations
 Hellenic Railways Organization
 TrainOSE
 Proastiakos
 P.A.Th.E./P.

References

Transport in Thessaloniki
Railway stations in Central Macedonia
Railway stations opened in 1961
Buildings and structures in Thessaloniki